Le Meix-Saint-Epoing is a commune in the Marne département in the Grand Est region of north-eastern France.

Inhabitants of Le Meix-Saint-Epoing are called Mexipontains (male) or Mexipontaines (female).

See also
Communes of the Marne department

References

Meixsaintepoing